Nicolae Reuter (born 6 December 1914) was a Romanian footballer who played as a striker. He scored two goals in the 4–0 victory in the 1943 Cupa României final against Sportul Studențesc București, which helped CFR Turnu Severin win the first trophy in the club's history. After he ended his playing career, Reuter worked as a manager.

International career
While playing in the second league for CAM Timișoara Nicolae Reuter made his debut at international level for Romania in a friendly which ended with a 4–0 victory against Latvia. At the 1946 Balkan Cup he played three games and scored two goals against Bulgaria and Yugoslavia, he also played two matches at the 1947 Balkan Cup.

Honours

Player
CAM Timișoara
Divizia B: 1938–39
Cupa României runner-up: 1937–38
CFR Turnu Severin
Cupa României: 1942–43
CFR Timișoara
Cupa României runner-up: 1947–48

References

External links
Nicolae Reuter player profile at Labtof.ro

1914 births
Romanian footballers
Romania international footballers
Association football forwards
Liga I players
Liga II players
CAM Timișoara players
FC CFR Timișoara players
Romanian football managers
FC Politehnica Timișoara managers
Sportspeople from Timișoara
Year of death missing